Joseph Trimble Tracy (December 28, 1865 – January 2, 1952), was a Republican politician from the U.S. State of Ohio. He was the Ohio State Auditor for sixteen years.

Life and career
Joseph T. Tracy was born while his parents, Noah and Nancy Ann Freeman Tracy, were living temporarily at Mt. Pleasant, Henry County, Iowa on December 28, 1865. Shortly after his birth, they moved back to Scioto County, Ohio, where Joseph grew up on a farm. He attended the Normal School at West Union, Ohio, and was a school teacher and county school examiner for five years. He then was deputy clerk of courts for Scioto County.

From 1893 to 1899, Tracy was County Auditor for Scioto County. In 1902, he was appointed municipal supervisor in the Bureau of Inspection and Supervision of Public Offices in the State Auditor's Department. He held that office for fourteen years, and helped establish accounting systems in seventy cities. He developed a statewide reputation that lead to his election as a Republican to Ohio State Auditor in 1920. He was re-elected in 1924, 1928 and 1932. He ran for Auditor again in 1940, but lost.

Tracy was married to Alnore Arnold of Portsmouth, Ohio on April 11, 1894. She died January 9, 1921, the day before Tracy was first inaugurated as Auditor. She had five children. Son Roger W. Tracy and grandson Roger W. Tracy, Jr. were also Ohio politicians. Alnore was buried at Green Lawn Cemetery, Columbus, Ohio. Joseph T. Tracy was a member of the Masonic Fraternity, Knights of Pythias, and the King Avenue Methodist Church in Columbus.

Joseph T. Tracy died at Columbus on January 2, 1952, and is buried at Green Lawn Cemetery.

References

External sources

1865 births
1952 deaths
Burials at Green Lawn Cemetery (Columbus, Ohio)
Ohio Republicans
Politicians from Columbus, Ohio
People from Scioto County, Ohio
State Auditors of Ohio